The 2016–17 Országos Bajnokság I (known as the e·on férfi OB I osztályú Országos Bajnokság for sponsorship reasons) was the 111th season of the Országos Bajnokság I, Hungary's premier Water polo league.

Team information

The following 16 clubs compete in the OB I during the 2016–17 season:

Head coaches

Regular season

Group A 

Pld - Played; W - Won; D - Drawn; L - Lost; GF - Goals for; GA - Goals against; Diff - Difference; Pts - Points.

Schedule and results
Results: waterpolo.hu

Group B 

Pld - Played; W - Won; D - Drawn; L - Lost; GF - Goals for; GA - Goals against; Diff - Difference; Pts - Points.

Schedule and results
Results: waterpolo.hu

Second round

Championship round 
The top four teams, from two groups advance from the regular season. Teams start the Championship round with their points from the Regular season. Key numbers for pairing determination (number marks position after 14 games):

Pld - Played; W - Won; D - Drawn; L - Lost; GF - Goals for; GA - Goals against; Diff - Difference; Pts - Points.

Schedule and results
Results: waterpolo.hu

Relegation round 
The bottom four teams, from two groups advance from the regular season. Teams start the Relegation round with their points from the Regular season.

Pld - Played; W - Won; D - Drawn; L - Lost; GF - Goals for; GA - Goals against; Diff - Difference; Pts - Points.

Schedule and results
Results: waterpolo.hu

Final round

1st – 4th Placement matches 

Game 1

ZF-Eger won the series 7–1 with points ratio, and advanced to the Final.

Game 2

Game 3

Szolnoki Dózsa-KÖZGÉP won the series 9–6 with points ratio, and advanced to the Final.

Final
Higher ranked team hosted Game 1 and Game 3 plus Game 5 if necessary. The lower ranked hosted Game 2 plus Game 4 if necessary.

Szolnoki Dózsa-KÖZGÉP won the Final series 3–0.

Third place
Higher ranked team hosted Game 1 plus Game 3 if necessary. The lower ranked hosted Game 2.

A-HÍD OSC Újbuda won the Third place.

5th – 8th Placement matches 

Fifth place game
Higher ranked team hosted Game 1 plus Game 3 if necessary. The lower ranked hosted Game 2.

Seventh place game
Higher ranked team hosted Game 1 plus Game 3 if necessary. The lower ranked hosted Game 2.

9th – 12th Placement matches 

Ninth place game
Higher ranked team hosted Game 1 plus Game 3 if necessary. The lower ranked hosted Game 2.

Eleventh place game
Higher ranked team hosted Game 1 plus Game 3 if necessary. The lower ranked hosted Game 2.

13th – 16th Placement matches 

Thirteenth place game
Higher ranked team hosted Game 1 plus Game 3 if necessary. The lower ranked hosted Game 2.

Fifteenth place game
Higher ranked team hosted Game 1 plus Game 3 if necessary. The lower ranked hosted Game 2.

Season statistics

Top goalscorers

Top exclusions

Most valuable player

Discipline

 Most goals conceded (club): 23
 Szolnoki Dózsa-KÖZGÉP  / Round 5, (Group A)
 Most goals conceded: 30
 Szolnoki Dózsa-KÖZGÉP 23–7 Debreceni VSE / Round 5, (Group A)
 Fewest goals conceded (club): 3
 KSI SE  / Round 4, (Group A)
 Fewest goals conceded: 8
 EBP Tatabánya 4–4 RacioNet Honvéd / Round 14, (Group B)
 Attendance:
 Highest: 1,224 ZF-Eger  / Final (1,3)
 Lowest: 50 KSI SE

Final standing

Awards
Best Goalkeeper:  Viktor Nagy (Szolnoki Dózsa-KÖZGÉP)
Best Field player:  Márton Vámos (Szolnoki Dózsa-KÖZGÉP)

Number of teams by counties

See also
2016 Magyar Kupa

References

External links
 Hungarian Water Polo Federaration 
 vlv.hu
 vizipolo.hu

Seasons in Hungarian water polo competitions
Hungary
Orszagos Bajnoksag I Men
Orszagos Bajnoksag I Men